Apocera zographica is a species of snout moth in the genus Apocera. It was described by Harrison Gray Dyar Jr. in 1913. It is found in Mexico, Venezuela and Argentina.

The larvae have been recorded feeding on Cardiospermum grandiflorum. The tie the leaves of their host plant together and feed from within.

References

Moths described in 1913
Epipaschiinae
Moths of Central America